John Joseph "Jack" Warner (August 15, 1872 – December 21, 1943) was a professional baseball catcher who played in Major League Baseball from 1895 through 1908. He played for the Boston Beaneaters, Louisville Colonels, New York Giants, Boston Americans, St. Louis Cardinals, Detroit Tigers and Washington Senators.

In 1906, Warner was part of the first season-long platoon arrangement in baseball, sharing time at catcher with Fred Payne and Boss Schmidt.

In 1,074 major league games, Warner had a .249 batting average and .303 on-base percentage.  He had 870 hits, 348 runs scored, 302 RBIs, 122 extra base hits, and 83 stolen bases.  Warner was among the league leaders in being hit by a pitch 3 times and ranks 123 all-time with 91 times hit by a pitch.  Warner was born in New York City and died in Far Rockaway, New York.

References

External links

1872 births
1943 deaths
Detroit Tigers players
New York Giants (NL) players
Louisville Colonels players
Boston Beaneaters players
Washington Senators (1901–1960) players
Boston Americans players
Major League Baseball catchers
Baseball players from New York (state)
Wilkes-Barre Coal Barons players
Rochester Browns players
Troy Trojans (minor league) players
Erie Sailors players
Minor league baseball managers
19th-century baseball players